Rupert High School was a public high school in Rupert, Idaho, United States. It was the first all electric public building in the United States, allowing it to be the first high school to offer technical programs like home economics (domestic science) and wood shop (the manual training department).

It served students from 1913 until the consolidation of Minidoka County high schools into Minico High School in 1956.

Notable alumni

Rep. Bert Stevenson, Idaho Legislature member

References

External links
Rupert High School alumni site

Defunct schools in Idaho
Educational institutions established in 1913
Educational institutions disestablished in 1956
Schools in Minidoka County, Idaho
1913 establishments in Idaho